Arthur Frank McKinlay (January 20, 1932 – August 10, 2009) was an American rower who competed in the 1956 Summer Olympics.

He was born in Detroit and was the twin brother of John McKinlay; both were 1950 graduates of Cooley High School.

In 1956, he was a crew member of the American boat which won the silver medal in the coxless fours event.

External links 
 
 
 Art McKinlay's obituary

1932 births
2009 deaths
Rowers at the 1956 Summer Olympics
Olympic silver medalists for the United States in rowing
American twins
Rowers from Detroit
Twin sportspeople
American male rowers
Medalists at the 1956 Summer Olympics
Cooley High School alumni